Eva García Pastor (born September 27, 1976) is an Andorran politician. She is a member of the Liberal Party of Andorra.

External links
Page at the General Council of the Principality of Andorra

Members of the General Council (Andorra)
1976 births
Living people
Liberal Party of Andorra politicians
Andorran women in politics
21st-century women politicians